Football (also known as Atari Football) is a 1978 American football video game developed and released by Atari, Inc. for arcades. Players are represented by Xs and Os. While predated by Sega's World Cup, Football is credited with popularizing the trackball controller and is also the first non-racing vertically scrolling video game. It distributed in Japan by Namco in 1979.

Football was the second highest-earning arcade video game of 1979 in the United States. That year Atari released a more challenging four-player version of the arcade game programmed by Dave Theurer, who later created Missile Command and Tempest.

An Atari VCS home version of Football was published in 1978. It uses blocky representations of players instead of Xs and Os. In 1982, Atari replaced it with RealSports Football.

Gameplay

Development
The game was designed by Steve Bristow and programmed by Michael Albaugh, with the hardware engineered by Dave Stubben. The game's use of a trackball was inspired by an earlier Japanese association football (soccer) game that had used trackball controls. When the team saw the game, they brought a cabinet to their lab and imitated the trackball controls.

An earlier association football game that used trackball controls was Sega's World Cup, released seven months earlier in March 1978. However, Steven L. Kent reported in 2001 that Stubben attributed the earlier trackball soccer game to Taito. In a later 2017 interview, Albaugh said he was uncertain which company it was from, but remembers it was from a Japanese company.

Atari's Football was released in October 1978.

Ports
On the Atari VCS, two teams of green and white players, each of four men, playing against each other. In a first game-option, before each play the player can select a formation, and then during each play the player controls their movement as a unit using the joystick controller. In a second game option, the player only chooses the formation with the play being carried out automatically according to a pre-selected plan. A third game-option is similar to the second except that the user may kick or punt at any time.

Reception
Football was the second highest-earning 1979 in the United States, below only Space Invaders (1978).

In his October 1979 review of the Atari VCS version of the game in Creative Computing, David H. Ahl gave the game a positive review. He praised particularly the gameplay which he described as "boast[ing] lively action".

Legacy
Although not the first trackball game, predated by Sega's World Cup in March 1978, Atari Football is credited with popularizing the trackball.

See also

 List of Atari 2600 games
 Gridiron Fight - 1985 American football game from Tehkan (Tecmo)
 Cyberball - 1988 American football game from Atari

References

External links
 Atari Football at the Killer List of Videogames
 The Atari Football Restoration Site

1978 video games
American football video games
Arcade video games
Arcade-only video games
Atari arcade games
North America-exclusive video games
Multiplayer and single-player video games
Trackball video games
Video games developed in the United States